Joaquin Arriola "Kido" Perez (March 14, 1916 – October 7, 1984) was a Democratic Party of Guam politician in Guam. Perez served eight terms as a senator in the Guam Legislature.

Early life

Personal life
Perez was married to Macrena Aquiningoc Perez. Together, they raised 5 children.

Guam Legislature
Perez first successfully ran as a senator in the Guam Legislature in 1950 and was reelected to 5 consecutive terms. He successfully ran as a senator in the Guam Legislature in 1968 and was reelected in 1970. He ran for senator in 1972 but was defeated in the general election.

Elections

Death

References

External links

1916 births
1984 deaths
20th-century American politicians
Chamorro people
Guamanian Democrats
Members of the Legislature of Guam